Miroslav Kristín (born January 22, 1982) is a Slovak professional ice hockey right winger currently playing for MHK Dubnica of the Slovak 1. Liga. 

He previously played in the Slovak Extraliga for MHK Dubnica, HK Dukla Trenčín and MsHK Žilina. He also played in the Ligue Magnus in France for Ducs de Dijon from 2005 to 2011.

Kristín played in the World Junior Ice Hockey Championships in 2001 and 2002 for Slovakia.

Kristín's younger brother Matej Kristín is a goaltender currently playing for HC Nové Zámky.

References

External links

1982 births
Living people
Boxers de Bordeaux players
Corsaires de Dunkerque players
Ducs de Dijon players
HK Dubnica players
HK Dukla Trenčín players
LHC Les Lions players
Slovak ice hockey right wingers
Sportspeople from Trenčín
MsHK Žilina players
Expatriate ice hockey players in France
Slovak expatriate ice hockey people
Slovak expatriate sportspeople in France